Cristóbal Ramírez may refer to:

Cristóbal Ramírez de Cartagena, 16th-century Spanish colonial governor of Peru
Cristóbal Ramírez (painter) (active 1566, died 1577), Spanish painter